Quarenghi is a surname. Notable people with the surname include:

 Federico Quarenghi (1858–1940), Italian painter
 Giacomo Quarenghi (1744–1817), Russian architect
 Guglielmo Quarenghi (1826–1882), Italian composer and cellist

Italian-language surnames